Laimonas Kisielius (born 24 January 1985) is a Lithuanian professional basketball player.

Playing career
On 30 December 2016, Kisielius signed with Lietuvos rytas Vilnius for the remainder of the 2016-17 season and the following 2017-18 season. On July 16, 2017, the team and Kisielius agreed to terminate contract for the 2017-18 season.

On July 27, 2017, Kisielius reached an agreement with Neptūnas Klaipėda and signed a two-year deal.

On August 9, 2019, Kisielius returned to Pieno žvaigždės Pasvalys.

References

External links
 Laimonas Kisielius LKL.lt profile (English and Lithuanian)

1986 births
Living people
Basketball players from Vilnius
BC Neptūnas players
BC Pieno žvaigždės players
BC Rytas players
BC Tsmoki-Minsk players
BK Liepājas Lauvas players
Forwards (basketball)
Lithuanian expatriate basketball people in the United States
Lithuanian men's basketball players
William & Mary Tribe men's basketball players